The 2016 Valdosta State Blazers football team represented Valdosta State University as a member of the Gulf South Conference (GSC) during the 2016 NCAA Division II football season. They were led by first-year head coach Kerwin Bell and  played their home games at Bazemore–Hyder Stadium in Valdosta, Georgia. Valdosta State compiled an overall record of 8–3 with a mark of 6–2 in conference play, placing second in the GSC.

Schedule
Valdosta State announced its 2016 football schedule on March 17, 2016. The schedule consisted of five home games, four away game, and one neutral site games in the regular season. The Blazers hosted GSC foes Delta State, Shorter, West Florida, and West Georgia, and traveled to Florida Tech, Mississippi College, North Alabama, and West Alabama.

The Blazers hosted one non-conference game against Albany State of the Southern Intercollegiate Athletic Conference (SIAC) and traveled to one neutral site game against Kentucky State, also from the SIAC.

References

Valdosta State
Valdosta State Blazers football seasons
Valdosta State Blazers football